Urtaul (Urtawıl) is a rural locality (a village) in Novoyanzigitovsky Selsoviet, Krasnokamsky District, Bashkortostan, Russia. The population was 14 as of 2010. There are 2 streets.

Geography 
Urtaul is located 41 km south of Nikolo-Beryozovka (the district's administrative centre) by road. Staraya Mushta is the nearest rural locality.

References 

Rural localities in Krasnokamsky District